Fancy Pants is a 1983 studio album by Count Basie and his orchestra. This is the last recording that Basie made with his big band.

Track listing
"Put It Right Here" (Louie Bellson, Nestico) – 5:14
"By My Side" – 5:18
"Blue Chip" – 4:04
"Fancy Pants" – 4:27
"Hi-Five" – 6:00
"Time Stream" – 4:11
"Samantha" – 4:29
"Strike Up the Band" (Ira Gershwin, George Gershwin) – 3:50

All music composed by Sammy Nestico, other composers and writers indicated.

Personnel
 Count Basie - piano
 Dale Carley - trumpet
 Sonny Cohn
 Jim Crawford
 Bob Summers
 Frank Szabo
 Bill Hughes - trombone
 Grover Mitchell
 Dennis Willson
 Mitchell "booty" Wood
 Danny Turner - alto saxophone
 Chris Woods
 Eric Dixon - tenor saxophone
 Kenny Hing
 Johnny Williams - baritone saxophone
 Freddie Green - guitar
 Cleveland Eaton - double bass
 Dennis Mackrel - drums
 Sammy Nestico - arranger, conductor

References

1986 albums
Count Basie Orchestra albums
Pablo Records albums
Albums arranged by Sammy Nestico
Albums produced by Norman Granz